Ranunculus micranthus is a flowering plant species in the Ranunculus (buttercup) family known by the common names rock buttercup and small-flowered crowfoot.  It is native to North America, with a distribution that covers much of the eastern United States. R. micranthus is very similar in appearance to R. abortivus (small-flowered buttercup). The distinguishing characteristics are the hairiness of their receptacles and shininess of their achenes.

References

micranthus
Flora of North America